Pteleopsis habeensis is a species of plant in the Combretaceae family. It is found in Ghana, Mali, and Nigeria.

References

habeensis
Endangered plants
Taxonomy articles created by Polbot
Taxobox binomials not recognized by IUCN